Brian Farrell, LC (born 8 February 1944), is an Irish prelate of the Catholic Church. He was named a bishop and the Secretary of the Pontifical Council for Promoting Christian Unity in December 2002.

Biography
Farrell was born in Dublin, Ireland, and joined the Legion of Christ in 1961. He was ordained a priest on 26 November 1969 in Rome. From 1970 to 1976 he was the novice director in the Legionary seminary in Orange, Connecticut, US. He obtained his licentiate in philosophy at the Pontifical Gregorian University and his licentiate in theology at the Pontifical University of Saint Thomas Aquinas, and in 1981 earned a doctorate in dogmatic theology from the Pontifical Gregorian University. From 1981 to 2002 he worked in the offices of the Vatican's Secretariat of State, from 1999 as head of the English desk in the Office of General Affairs. In 1985, as an official of the Secretariat, he opposed legislation to allow the sale of condoms in Ireland.

On 19 December 2002 he was appointed Titular Bishop of Abitinae and Secretary of the Pontifical Council for Promoting Christian Unity. He was consecrated a bishop on 6 January 2003 by Pope John Paul II. Pope Francis confirmed his appointment to the Council on 19 February 2014. As Secretary of the Council he is ex officio the Vice-President of the Commission for Religious Relations with the Jews.

In 2003 Farrell contributed an article to the catalogue for "The Tension of Origin," an exhibition of works by Italian artist Giovanni Bonaldi which engaged in Jewish-Christian dialogue through artistic expression.

In 2010 Farrell was one of four advisors to Archbishop Velasio De Paolis when De Paolis was Papal Delegate to the Congregation of the Legionaries of Christ tasked with reorganizing that  congregation.

Brian Farrell is the older brother of Cardinal Kevin Farrell, Camerlengo of the Holy Roman Church, Prefect of the Dicastery for Laity, Family and Life, former Bishop of Dallas.

External links
Bishop Brian Farrell: Quest for Christian Unity: Where It Stands 2004 Interview With Bishop Farrell, Secretary of Council for Promoting Christian Unity.

References

1944 births
Living people
Christian clergy from Dublin (city)
Irish Roman Catholic titular bishops
Pontifical Gregorian University alumni
Pontifical University of Saint Thomas Aquinas alumni
21st-century Roman Catholic titular bishops
Pontifical Council for Promoting Christian Unity